Marian Mildred Dale Scott  (1906–1993) was a Canadian painter.

Life
She was born Marian Mildred Dale in Montreal on 26 June 1906. She showed talent at an early age: her first works were exhibited in 1918. She attended The Study, a private school for girls, for three years and later became one of the first students at the École des beaux-arts de Montréal in 1924. After study in London at the Slade School of Art, she returned to her home city, where in 1928 she married the poet and law professor F. R. Scott. They had one son, the diplomat Peter Dale Scott.

Scott's career began with landscapes, followed by cityscapes which reflected her social concerns. In the 1940s, she sought inspiration in scientific literature. In the 1950s, she was inspired by biblical subjects. She then became an abstract artist.

In the 1930s, Scott was active in anti-fascist movements and the Co-operative Commonwealth Federation, which her husband had helped found. She also taught art to disadvantaged children as part of an organization set up by her close friend Norman Bethune. As a pacifist, she campaigned for nuclear disarmament in the 1950s and against the Vietnam War in the 1960s.

Scott was a founding member of the short-lived but influential Contemporary Arts Society of Montreal ("Société d'art contemporain", 1939–1948), and was elected to the Royal Canadian Academy of Arts in 1973. She taught at St. George's School, the Montreal Museum of Fine Arts, and at Macdonald College.

Scott died on 28 November 1993 in Montreal.

Awards
 Thomas More Institute, Purchase Award, 1967 
 Ontario Society of Artists, Baxter Purchase Award, 1969

Bibliography
Marian Dale Scott: Pioneer of Modern Art. Esther Trépanier. Musée du Québec, 2000.

References

External links
Marian Dale Scott images at Mayberry Fine Art

1906 births
1993 deaths
20th-century Canadian women artists
Alumni of the Slade School of Fine Art
Artists from Montreal
Canadian women painters
École des beaux-arts de Montréal alumni
Members of the Royal Canadian Academy of Arts